A silver age is a particular period within a history coming after a historical golden age, similarly prestigious and eventful but less so than the prior Golden Age. The name derives from the fact that the metal silver is valuable but less so than gold in many cultures.

Greek myth
The original silver age (Αργυρόν Γένος) was the second of the five "Ages of Man" described by the ancient poet Hesiod in his poem Works and Days, following the Golden age and preceding the Bronze Age. These people lived for one hundred years as children without growing up, then suddenly aged and died. Zeus destroyed these people because of their impiety, in the Ogygian Deluge.

After Kronos was exiled, the world was ruled by Zeus. As a result of Pandora releasing the evils upon the world, a second generation of men and the age was called silver because the race of man was less noble than the race of the Golden Age.

In the silver age Zeus reduced the spring, and reconstructed the year into four seasons, so that men for the first time sought the shelter of houses and had to labor to supply their food.

The first seeds of grain were placed in the ground since now man had to gather their own food. A child grew up at his mother's side a hundred years, but adulthood lasted a short time. Being less noble than the Golden Age, humanity could not keep from fighting with one another, nor would they properly honor and or serve the immortals. The actions of the second generation infuriated Zeus, so in punishment he destroyed them.

Other silver ages
The term has been applied to a number of other periods following a "Golden Age", including:

 The Silver Age of Latin literature
 The Silver Age of Comic Books, the 2000 DC Comics series Silver Age was named after the period
 The Silver Age of Russian Poetry
 The Silver Age of Alpinism
 The Treta Yuga of Vedic philosophy of the ages.

External links
Greek Mythology Link: Silver Age
About.com: Hesiod's Ages of Man

Historical eras
Historiography